Fares Al-Garzae (born 13 April 2001) is a Saudi Arabian professional footballer who plays as a forward for Pro League side Al-Shabab.

Club career
Al-Garzae started his career at hometown club Al-Najma. On 26 October 2020, Al-Garzae joined Al-Shabab. On 30 January 2021, Al-Garzae was named on the bench for the first time in the league match against Abha. On 16 October 2021, Al-Garzae made his league debut by coming off the bench against Al-Batin.

References

External links
 

2001 births
Living people
Saudi Arabian footballers
People from Unaizah
Association football forwards
Saudi Professional League players
Al-Shabab FC (Riyadh) players